The Mahoning Formation is a geologic formation in Ohio. It preserves fossils dating back to the Carboniferous period.

See also

 List of fossiliferous stratigraphic units in Ohio

References
 

Carboniferous Ohio
Carboniferous southern paleotropical deposits